Johannes (Jussi) Muilu (born 27 June 1901 in Lapua, Finland - died 24 October 1976 in Lapua, Finland) was a farmer from Southern Ostrobothnia, Finland who was active in the Lapua Movement in the early 1930s.

Jussi Muilu was born to parents Juho Muilu and Liisa Malkamäki. He was interested in machinery and owned a Ford Model T already in the 1920s and also worked as a chauffeur with a bus. In the Lapua Movement, he quickly became known for his active participation in kidnapping, which even led to the Finnish word "muiluttaa" (literally "to Muilu", meaning "to kidnap") being invented in his name.

Muilu himself said that the word had been invented by Martti Pihkala, who invented it after seeing the sturdily built Muilu walking along a plank to a cattle transport wagon during the peasants' march. Martti Pihkala said about this:

Translation:

References

1901 births
1976 deaths
Finnish political activists